Jamie-Lee Napier (born 6 April 2000) is a Scottish professional footballer who plays as a full-back or winger for London City Lionesses of the FA Women's Championship and the Scotland national team.

Club career
Napier started her career with Celtic before moving to Hibernian in January 2018. She scored 22 goals in 33 games for Hibernian in 2019 and was named the league's player of the year.

In January 2020, she was named by UEFA as one of the 10 most promising young players in Europe.

Napier signed for London City Lionesses ahead of the 2021–22 season, and scored the winner in her second game in the South London derby against Crystal Palace.

International career
Napier received her first call-up to the Scotland women's national football team in August 2019. She was named again in the squad for the 2023 Pinatar Cup, and made her full international debut there in a match with the Philippines.

References

External links
 

2000 births
Living people
Scottish women's footballers
Scottish Women's Premier League players
Hibernian W.F.C. players
Celtic F.C. Women players
Chelsea F.C. Women players
Women's Super League players
Women's association football midfielders
Footballers from Glasgow
Birmingham City W.F.C. players
London City Lionesses players
Women's Championship (England) players
Scotland women's international footballers